Ellon and District is one of the nineteen wards used to elect members of the Aberdeenshire Council. It elects four Councillors.

Councillors

Election results

2022 election
2022 Aberdeenshire Council election

2017 election
2017 Aberdeenshire Council election

2012 election
2012 Aberdeenshire Council election

2007 election
2007 Aberdeenshire Council election

By-election
Following the election of Richard Thomson (SNP) to Westminster at the 2019 United Kingdom general election on 12 December and his subsequent resignation as Councillor for Ellon & District ward a by-election was called on Thursday, 15 October 2020.

2020 By-election
Ellon & District By-election 2020 - Aberdeenshire Council

References

Wards of Aberdeenshire